The Royal Cambodian Armed Forces (RCAF; ,) is Cambodia's national military force. The Supreme Commander-in-Chief is King Norodom Sihamoni. Since 2018, General Vong Pisen has been the Commander-in-Chief of the RCAF as head of the Army, Navy, Air Force and the Gendarmerie. The armed forces operate under the jurisdiction of the Ministry of National Defence. Under the country's constitution, the RCAF is charged with protecting the sovereignty and territorial integrity of the Kingdom of Cambodia.

It was created in 1993 by a merger of the Cambodian People's Armed Forces and the two non-communist resistance armies. Two resistance forces, the Khmer Rouge and the royalist National United Army (NUA) opposed the government. The forerunner of the Cambodian Armed Forces is Division 125, established in 1978 by Hun Sen (now prime minister) with support from the Vietnamese People's Army.

The Royal Cambodian Army is the largest RCAF branch, with troops stationed in each of the country's 25 provinces. The Royal Cambodian Navy, the second-largest branch and operates along the Mekong and Bassac Rivers and in the Tonlé Sap lake. The 10,000-person military police force parallels the civilian police, and has posts in every province and municipality across the country. The Royal Cambodian Air Force, the smallest service branch with 5,000 members, operates in every province which has an airport.

History

Royal Khmer Armed Forces

The Royal Khmer Armed Forces (FARK) was established on 9 November 1953 under a Franco-Khmer convention. This contributed to the end of the French colony and protectorate, and Cambodia obtained its own military organisation. FARK's roles were to guarantee the sovereignty of the nation and the king; to ensure security, social order and the respect of law, and to defend the kingdom of Cambodia. With 50,000 troops, FARK was organised at battalion level under the Supreme Commander of the Armed Forces (the head of state). At this early stage of the nation, its armed forces were often armed with little more than wooden rifles to fool aggressive Việt Minh forces. This forced King Norodom Sihanouk to sign border-treaty agreements with Vietnam which were unfavorable to Cambodia, resulting in the loss of much territory.

Khmer National Armed Forces
The military situation changed dramatically after the March 1970 coup d'état. Under the Khmer Republic regime, FARK was renamed the Khmer National Armed Forces (Forces armées nationales khmères, or FANK). FANK was expanded to 200,000 military personnel, organized in brigades and divisions, in response to a state of emergency during the Cambodian Civil War; all armed forces were commanded by the president. When facing the NVA, Viet Cong or Khmer Rouge, FANK operated at full strength and was often victorious. Prince Norodom Sihanouk broadcast radio propaganda, urging listeners to go to the jungle and join the communists to fight the FANK forces. Some corrupt FANK commanders who were royalist supporters sold their weapons and intelligence to the opposition Khmer Rouge. Many FANK commanders, such as Norodom Chantaraingsey, were at the front lines launching operations against the communist forces. The United States Congress lost confidence in FANK in late 1973, halting military aid due to corruption.

Revolutionary Army of Kampuchea
After the downfall of the Khmer Republic in April 1975, the Khmers Rouge régime established the Revolutionary Army of Kampuchea (RAK). The army was composed of Khmer Rouge soldiers and defectors from Lon Nol's FANK. Defectors who joined the Khmer Rouge were never fully trusted by the original Khmer Rouge. They were later purged by Pol Pot, when thousands of Khmer Rouge soldiers and officers were ordered killed by the Khmer Rouge leadership. Like the other forces, the RAK was organised to the division level and commanded by Chiefs of the General Staff Son Sen and Ta Mok. The RAK's 375,000-person, fully armed force was supplied by China and several Eastern Bloc countries. When Democratic Kampuchea invaded Kampuchea Krom in southern Vietnam (known as Prey Nokor when it was Cambodian territory before 1949), the Vietnamese forces were caught off-guard and their double agents in the Khmer Rouge proved valuable. The double agents were later learned to have become members of the Kampuchean People's Revolutionary Armed Forces (KPRAF), the armed forces of the People's Republic of Kampuchea.

Kampuchean People's Revolutionary Armed Forces

After the intervention of the Vietnamese forces in January 1979 (resulting in the collapse of the Khmer Rouge regime, the Kampuchean People's Revolutionary Armed Forces (KPRAF) was formed. It changed its name to the Cambodian People's Armed Forces (CPAF) of the Phnom Penh government when it was rebuilt, and evolved from battalions to divisions.

Anti-Vietnamese movements formed along the Cambodian-Thai border. In addition to the remaining National Army of Democratic Kampuchea (NADK), two other non-communist resistance forces – the Khmer People's National Liberation Armed Forces (KPNLAF) and the Armées Nationale pour Khmer Independent (ANKI, previously the Armées Nationale Sihanoukist or ANS) – were established.  The military evolution of the latter two movements was similar: from small, armed groups to divisions.

Because of the Cold War and the interference of global powers, Cambodia found itself insecure since the 1970s. This was only partially resolved with the October 1991 Paris Peace Agreements, because the KPRAF still dominated three resistance groups: the Khmer Rouge, the KPNLF, and the ANKI.

Re-establishment of the RCAF
The Royal Cambodian Armed Forces was re-established in 1993 after the democratic election of a government consisting of two prime ministers. The armed forces of all parties except the NADK were integrated into a national armed force; the NADK joined in 1998, after Pol Pot's death. The KPRAF dominated the three integrated guerrilla groups, with ANKI and the Khmer Rouge commanders later replaced by those loyal to the KPRAF.

To resolve security problems, the government began a win-win policy in mid-1995 of national reconciliation and unity efforts under the king. Defections of NADK units began in early 1996. The win-win policy of Prime Minister Hun Sen continued to succeed as the last groups of Khmer Rouge guerrillas were integrated into the RCAF in late 1998; this marked the dissolution of the Khmer Rouge's political and military organisation and the return of all seceded areas to government control.

The RCAF undergoes reforms in accordance with governmental guidelines which direct the armed forces to demobilize to an acceptable size, achieve capability and inculcate standards of ethics and dignity, with future advancement towards international standardization. Its agenda includes regional security co-operation.

Branches
The RCAF has four branches: the Royal Cambodian Army, the Royal Cambodian Navy, the Royal Cambodian Air Force and the Royal Gendarmerie of Cambodia.

Royal Gendarmerie of Cambodia
The Royal Gendarmerie of Cambodia, a paramilitary unit with 10,000 soldiers deployed in all provinces, is headquartered in Phnom Penh. The unit's chain of command is through the Royal Cambodian Armed Forces High Command, and it is commanded by General Sao Sokha. Sokha was one of the commanders who defeated FUNCINPEC forces during the July 1997 coup.

Strength

In 2001, co-Minister of Defence Sisowath Sirirath said that total Cambodian military strength stood at about 120,000 men. Since the end of fighting and the surrender of the last Khmer Rouge remnants, the Cambodian military has undergone substantial changes as it shifts to a peacetime force.

Since 1999, the government has been working to demobilise large numbers of soldiers with support from the World Bank. Demobilisation efforts began in February 2000, and the first 10,000 soldiers were demobilised in a pilot project later that year. In 2001, the first phase of demobilisation got underway; twenty thousand soldiers returned to civilian life in large ceremonies around the country. Although a second phase of demobilisation was planned for 2003 in which an additional 30,000 servicemen would leave the armed forces, the process has been stalled by allegations of corruption and procurement irregularities.

See also
 History of Cambodia
 Cambodian Civil War
 Khmer Republic
 Khmer National Armed Forces
 List of weapons of the Cambodian Civil War
 Meas Sophea
 Hun Sen

References

Further reading
 Dylan Hendrickson, 'Cambodia's security-sector reforms: limits of a downsizing strategy,' Conflict, Security, and Development, Volume 1, Issue 1.
 Gerald Segal and Mats Berdal, 'The Cambodia Dilemma,' Jane's Intelligence Review, March 1993, p. 131-2. Includes listing of formations and equipment of the various factions.
 Robert Karniol, 'Confined to local waters,' Naval Forces Update, Jane's Defence Weekly, 20 June 1992, p. 1097. Status of Cambodian navy.

External links
 High Command Badge
 Homepage – in Khmer

Military of Cambodia
Military units and formations of the Cold War